Liping is a town in Wen County, Gansu, China. In 2008 it had a population of 13,024. The township's administrative centre is in Lijiaba village (李家坝), and it governs over 22 administrative villages. In 2016 it was upgraded from township to town.

It was established in 1949. The township has a small minority of Tibetan and/or Baima (who are officially counted as Tibetan), and Hui inhabitants.
Township-level divisions of Gansu

References